Arrieta (both in Basque and Spanish) is a town and municipality located in the province of Biscay, in the Basque Country, Spain. Arrieta is part of the comarca of Mungialdea. It had a population of 552 inhabitants as of 2007, and a population of 564 inhabitants as of 2017.

Toponym
This municipality has its origin in the elizate Líbano de Arrieta, which became a municipality in the 19th Century. The toponym Arrieta comes from the Basque word harrieta, which means "stony place".

Celebrities
 Santiago Arriaga y Arrien, Santiago de Jesús (1903-1936): was a priest of the Trinitarian Order. He was assassinated during the Spanish Civil war and beautified in 2007 by the Catholic Church.
 José Ramón Goyeneche Bilbao (1940): cyclist who participated in Tokyo Olympic Games in 1964.

References

External links
 ARRIETA in the Bernardo Estornés Lasa - Auñamendi Encyclopedia (Euskomedia Fundazioa) 

Municipalities in Biscay